The 1995–96 NBA season was the Rockets' 29th season in the National Basketball Association, and 25th season in Houston. In the off-season, the Rockets signed free agents Mark Bryant and Eldridge Recasner. After two straight NBA championships, the team changed their primary logo, which showed a light blue rocket flying past a red basketball with the team name "Rockets", and added new pinstripe uniforms adding dark navy blue to their color scheme. The Rockets got off to a fast start winning ten of their first eleven games. However, injuries would be an issue all year, with Clyde Drexler only playing 52 games due to knee and ankle injuries, Sam Cassell only playing 61 games due to elbow and foot injuries, and Mario Elie only playing just 45 games due to wrist and arm injuries. At midseason, the Rockets signed free agent Sam Mack, who previously played in the Continental Basketball Association, as the team held a 31–18 record at the All-Star break. Despite the injuries and a 7-game losing streak in March, the Rockets finished third in the Midwest Division with a 48–34 record.

Hakeem Olajuwon averaged 26.9 points, 10.9 rebounds, 3.6 assists, 1.6 steals and 2.9 blocks per game, and was named to the All-NBA Second Team, and NBA All-Defensive Second Team, while Drexler averaged 19.3 points, 7.2 rebounds, 5.8 assists and 2.0 steals per game. Olajuwon and Drexler were both selected for the 1996 NBA All-Star Game. In addition, Cassell played a sixth man role, averaging 14.5 points and 4.6 assists per game off the bench, while Robert Horry provided the team with 12.0 points, 5.8 rebounds, 4.0 assists, 1.6 steals and 1.5 blocks per game, Elie provided with 11.1 points per game, and Mack contributed 10.8 points per game. Chucky Brown averaged 8.6 points and 5.4 rebounds per game, while Bryant provided with 8.6 points and 4.9 rebounds per game off the bench, three-point specialist Kenny Smith contributed 8.5 points and 3.6 assists per game, and Recasner contributed 6.9 points and 2.7 assists per game. Olajuwon also finished in fourth place in Most Valuable Player voting, and in fifth place in Defensive Player of the Year voting, while Cassell finished in fourth place in Sixth Man of the Year voting, and head coach Rudy Tomjanovich finished in fifth place in Coach of the Year voting.

In the Western Conference First Round of the playoffs, the Rockets defeated the 4th-seeded Los Angeles Lakers in four games; All-Star guard Magic Johnson had come out of his retirement midway through the season, and would retire again after the Lakers' loss to the Rockets. However, the Rockets would be swept in the Western Conference Semi-finals by the Seattle SuperSonics in four straight games. The Sonics would reach the NBA Finals, but eventually fell in six games to the Michael Jordan-led Chicago Bulls.

Following the season, Cassell, Horry, Brown and Bryant were all traded to the Phoenix Suns, while Smith signed as a free agent with the Detroit Pistons, and Recasner signed with the Atlanta Hawks. The Rockets' new primary logo and uniforms both remained in use until 2003.

Offseason

Draft picks

Roster

Regular season

Season standings

z – clinched division title
y – clinched division title
x – clinched playoff spot

Record vs. opponents

Game log

Playoffs

|- align="center" bgcolor="#ccffcc"
| 1
| April 25
| @ L.A. Lakers
| W 87–83
| Hakeem Olajuwon (33)
| Horry, Olajuwon (7)
| Drexler, Smith (4)
| Great Western Forum17,505
| 1–0
|- align="center" bgcolor="#ffcccc"
| 2
| April 27
| @ L.A. Lakers
| L 94–104
| Sam Cassell (22)
| Horry, Olajuwon (8)
| Sam Cassell (8)
| Great Western Forum17,505
| 1–1
|- align="center" bgcolor="#ccffcc"
| 3
| April 30
| L.A. Lakers
| W 104–98
| Hakeem Olajuwon (30)
| Robert Horry (10)
| Clyde Drexler (11)
| The Summit16,285
| 2–1
|- align="center" bgcolor="#ccffcc"
| 4
| May 2
| L.A. Lakers
| W 102–94
| Hakeem Olajuwon (25)
| Hakeem Olajuwon (11)
| Olajuwon, Drexler (7)
| The Summit16,285
| 3–1
|-

|- align="center" bgcolor="#ffcccc"
| 1
| May 4
| @ Seattle
| L 75–108
| Robert Horry (18)
| Clyde Drexler (9)
| Kenny Smith (5)
| KeyArena17,072
| 0–1
|- align="center" bgcolor="#ffcccc"
| 2
| May 6
| @ Seattle
| L 101–105
| Clyde Drexler (19)
| Hakeem Olajuwon (16)
| Kenny Smith (7)
| KeyArena17,072
| 0–2
|- align="center" bgcolor="#ffcccc"
| 3
| May 10
| Seattle
| L 112–115
| Clyde Drexler (28)
| Hakeem Olajuwon (13)
| Kenny Smith (11)
| The Summit16,285
| 0–3
|- align="center" bgcolor="#ffcccc"
| 4
| May 12
| Seattle
| L 107–114 (OT)
| Hakeem Olajuwon (26)
| Clyde Drexler (15)
| Drexler, Cassell (6)
| The Summit16,611
| 0–4
|-

Player statistics

NOTE: Please write the players statistics in alphabetical order by last name.

Season

Playoffs

Awards and records

Awards
Hakeem Olajuwon, All-NBA Second Team
Hakeem Olajuwon, NBA All-Defensive Second Team

Records

Transactions

Trades

Free agents

Additions

Subtractions

See also
1995–96 NBA season

References

Houston Rockets seasons